The Men's heavyweight powerlifting event at the 2022 Commonwealth Games took place at the National Exhibition Centre on 4 August 2022.

Schedule 
All times are British Summer Time (UTC+1)

Result

References

External links 

Powerlifting at the 2022 Commonwealth Games